Bentee or Benatee is a hill overlooking the town of Cahersiveen in County Kerry, Ireland.

Geography 

Access to the summit 
In recent years the Bentee Loop walking trail has been created. The main paths are over farmland, with the permission of the owners.

References

Mountains and hills of County Kerry
Marilyns of Ireland
Cahersiveen